The University of Texas at Dallas (also referred to as UT Dallas or UTD) is a public research university in the University of Texas System.  The University of Texas at Dallas main campus is located in Richardson, Texas.

The University of Texas at Dallas offers over 145 academic programs across its eight schools including, 53 baccalaureate programs, 62 masters programs and 30 doctoral programs and hosts more than 50 research centers and institutes. The school also offers 30 undergraduate and graduate certificates. With a number of interdisciplinary degree programs, its curriculum is designed to allow study that crosses traditional disciplinary lines and to enable students to participate in collaborative research labs.

The Erik Jonsson School of Engineering and Computer Science launched the first accredited telecommunications engineering degree in the U.S. and is one of only a handful of institutions offering a degree in software engineering. The Bioengineering department offers MS and PhD degrees in biomedical engineering in conjunction with programs at the University of Texas Southwestern Medical Center at Dallas and the University of Texas at Arlington. Dual degrees offered at UTD include M.S. Electrical Engineering (M.S.E.E.) degree in combination with an MBA in management, Molecular Biology and Business Administration (Double Major) B.S., and Molecular Biology and Criminology (Double Major) B.S.. Geospatial Information Sciences is jointly offered with the School of Natural Sciences and Mathematics and with the School of Economic, Political and Policy Sciences, which administers the degree. UT Dallas is the fourth university in the nation to have received an accreditation for a Geospatial Intelligence certificate. The Geospatial Intelligence Certificate is backed by the US Geospatial Intelligence Foundation (USGIF). The university is designated a National Center of Academic Excellence and a National Center of Academic Excellence in Information Assurance Research for the academic years 2008–2013 by the National Security Agency and Department of Homeland Security.

School of Arts, Humanities and Technology
The newest of UT Dallas’ schools, the School of Arts, Humanities and Technology (AHT) was formed as a merger between the School of Arts and Humanities (A&H) and the School of Arts, Technology, and Emerging Communication (ATEC). The merger between the two schools was approved by the UT System in July 2022 and went into effect at the beginning of the Fall 2022 semester. According to Inga H. Musselman, vice president for academic affairs, the purpose of the merger was to “enhance the student experience, advance research and support the mission of [the] arts, humanities, technology, and communication programs.” This merger was stated to not affect any degree programs or curriculums that were part of either school of study. As of September 2022, there have been no plans announced to create any new degree plans or buildings for this school of study.

Academics
The School of Arts, Humanities and Technology offers courses in literature, animation, game design, critical media studies, foreign languages, history, philosophy, music, drama, and film.

At the undergraduate level, the school offers Bachelor of Arts degrees in history, Latin American Studies, Literature, Philosophy, Visual and Performing Arts, & Arts, Technology, and Emerging Communication. The school also offers 20 minors, which include Art History, Ethnic Studies, Literature, and Theater.

The School of Arts, Humanities and Technology also offers a variety of graduate degrees. There are Master of Arts programs for Art History, History, History of Ideas, Humanities, Latin American Studies, Literature, Visual and Performing Arts, & Arts, Technology, and Emerging Communication (Arts, Technology, and Emerging Communication also offers a Master of Fine Arts program). The school also offers Doctoral Studies in History of Ideas, Humanities, Literature, Visual and Performing Arts, & Arts, Technology, and Emerging Communication.

The School of Arts, Humanities and Technology also has certificate programs for Creative Writing, Literary Translation, & Holocaust, Genocide, and Human Rights Studies. There are also a variety of language study courses housed under the school that are not directly related to a specific degree plan, such as Arabic, French, German, and Japanese.

Merged Schools of Study
The School of Arts and Humanities was established in 1975.

The School of Arts, Technology, and Emerging Communication originated as two separate degree programs hosted under the School of Arts and Humanities, and was done as a joint venture alongside the Computer Science department of the Erik Jonsson School of Engineering. The first program for Arts and Technology was introduced in 2004, and the second program for Emerging Media and Communication was introduced in 2008. Due to the high number of students enrolling in the degree programs, it was announced that the degree programs would be merging into a new school of study. The School of Arts, Technology, and Emerging Communication was officially authorized by the UT System Board in 2015.

The School of Arts, Humanities, and Technology was established in 2022 as a merger of the former School of Arts and Humanities and School of Arts, Technology, and Emerging Communication.

Centers and institutes
Ackerman Center for Holocaust Studies
Center for Asian Studies
Center for Translation Studies
Center for US-Latin America Initiatives (CUSLAI)
Center for Values in Medicine, Science and Technology
The Crow Collection of Asian Art
The Edith O'Donnell Institute of Art History
SP/N Gallery

Labs and Studios
3D Studio
Anechoic Chamber and Transmedia Studio
AntÉ Institute
ArtSciLab
CG Animation Lab
Creative Automata Lab
Critical Media Studies Lab
Emerging Gizmology Lab
experimenta.l. Animation Lab
Fashioning Circuits
Game Lab
Games Research Lab
LabSynthE
Mograph Lab
Motion Capture Lab
Narrative Systems Research Lab
Public Interactives Research Lab (PIRL)
SP&CE Media
The Studio for Mediating Play

School of Behavioral and Brain Sciences

The School of Behavioral and Brain Sciences (BBS) opened in 1963 and is housed in Green Hall on the main campus of the University of Texas at Dallas and in the Callier Center for Communication Disorders. The 2012 US News & World Report ranked the university's graduate audiology program 3rd in the nation and its graduate speech-pathology program 11th in the nation.

Centers and institutes
Center for Advanced Pain Studies
Callier Center for Communication Disorders
Center for BrainHealth
Center for Children and Families
The Center for Vital Longevity

School of Economic, Political and Policy Sciences
The School of Economic, Political and Policy Sciences (EPPS) offers courses and programs in criminology, economics, geography and geospatial sciences, political science, public affairs, public policy and political economy, and sociology. UTD became the first university in Texas to implement a PhD Criminology program on October 26, 2006, when its program was approved by the Texas Higher Education Coordinating Board. The EPPS program was the first from Texas admitted to the University Consortium for Geographic Information Science and offered the first Master of Science in geospatial information sciences in Texas. UTD is one of four universities offering the Geospatial Information Sciences certificate. The Geospatial Intelligence Certificate is backed by the United States Geospatial Intelligence Foundation (USGIF), a collection of many organizations including Raytheon, Lockheed Martin and GeoEye. UT Dallas’ Geography and Geospatial Sciences program ranked 16th nationally and first in Texas by Academic Analytics of Stony Brook, N.Y. In a 2012 study, assessing the academic impact of publications, the UT Dallas criminology program was ranked fifth best in the world. The findings were  published in the Journal of Criminal Justice Education.

Centers and institutes

Center for Crime and Justice Studies
Center for Global Collective Action
Center for the Study of Texas Politics
Institute for Public Affairs
Institute for Urban Policy Research
The Negotiations Center

Erik Jonsson School of Engineering and Computer Science

The Erik Jonsson School of Engineering and Computer Science opened in 1986 and houses the Computer Science and Electrical Engineering departments as well as UTD's Computer Engineering, Materials Science & Engineering, Software Engineering, and Telecommunications Engineering programs. In 2002 the UTD Erik Jonsson School of Engineering and Computer Science was the first in the United States to offer an ABET-accredited B.S. degree in telecommunications engineering and is one of only a handful of institutions offering a degree in software engineering. The Bioengineering department offers MS and PhD degrees in biomedical engineering in conjunction with programs at the University of Texas Southwestern Medical Center at Dallas and the University of Texas at Arlington. UT Dallas undergraduate programs in engineering have emerged in U.S. News & World Report's annual rankings placing 60th among the nation's public schools of engineering. The school's graduate program U.S. News ranked 46th among public graduate schools of engineering and third among publicly funded schools in Texas. The school's electrical engineering graduate program ranked 38th among comparable programs at other public universities and the graduate program in computer science is among the top 50 such programs at public universities. The school is developing new programs in bioengineering, chemical engineering, and systems engineering. The school is designated a National Center of Academic Excellence and a National Center of Academic Excellence in Information Assurance Research for the academic years 2008–2013 by the National Security Agency and Department of Homeland Security.

Centers and institutes

Center for Advanced Telecommunications Systems and Services (CATSS)
Center for Integrated Circuits and Systems (CICS)
Center for Systems, Communications and Signal Processing (CSCSP)
Cybersecurity Research Center (CSRC)
Embedded Software Center
Emergency Preparedness Center
Global Information Assurance Center
Photonic Technology and Engineering Center (PhoTEC)
Texas Analog Center of Excellence
CyberSecurity and Emergency Preparedness Institute
Human Language Technology Research Institute
Center for Basic Research in Natural Language Processing
Center for Emerging Natural Language Applications
Center for Machine Learning and Language Processing
Center for Robust Speech Systems (CRSS)
Center for Search Engines and Web Technologies
Center for Text Mining
CyberSecurity Research Center
Embedded Software Center 
Emergency Preparedness Center
Global Information Assurance Center 
InterVoice Center for Conversational Technologies

School of Interdisciplinary Studies
The School of Interdisciplinary Studies, formerly The School of General Studies, provides interdisciplinary programs encouraging students to understand and integrate the liberal arts and sciences. The school offers a Bachelor of Arts in Interdisciplinary Studies, Bachelor of Science in Interdisciplinary Studies, Bachelor of Science in Healthcare Studies and Masters of Arts in Interdisciplinary Studies.

Naveen Jindal School of Management

The School of Management opened in 1975 and was renamed to the Naveen Jindal School of Management on October 7, 2011, after alumnus Naveen Jindal donated $15 million to the business school. The school is accredited by the Association to Advance Collegiate Schools of Business. UTD's undergraduate business programs ranked 81st overall and 39th among public university business schools in the U.S. according to BusinessWeek's 2010 rankings and ranked 30th in overall student satisfaction The Bloomberg BusinessWeek public universities rankings of undergraduate programs by specialty placed the UTD school of management 10th in both accounting and business law, 1st in teaching of quantitative methods, 3rd in teaching of calculus and  sustainability concepts,  6th in financial management,  7th in ethics and 9th in corporate strategy course work. The 2010 U.S. News & World Report ranks the Full-Time MBA program among the top 50 in the nation, 24th among the nation's public universities and 3rd for public school programs in the state of Texas. Bloomberg BusinessWeek, 2009, ranked the UTD Executive MBA program "top ranked" at 22 globally and the Professional Part-Time MBA program in the top 25 nationally. The Wall Street Journal ranked UTD's Executive MBA program 6th in the nation by ROI and the 2009 Financial Times rankings placed UTD's Executive MBA program 1st for public universities in Texas and 51 globally. In 2015 the Full-Time MBA and Professional MBA programs at the UT Dallas Naveen Jindal School of Management have been ranked at number 42 by Bloomberg BusinessWeek. In the 2018 Best B-School by Bloomberg, The Jindal School sits at number 43.

Centers and institutes 

Center and Laboratory for Behavioral Operations and Economics
Center for Finance Strategy Innovation 
Center for Information Technology and Management
Center for Intelligent Supply Networks 
Center for the Analysis of Property Rights and Innovation 
Institute for Excellence in Corporate Governance 
Institute for Innovation and Entrepreneurship
Center for Internal Auditing Excellence
International Accounting Development: Oil and Gas 
International Center for Decision and Risk Analysis 
Leadership Center at UT Dallas 
Morris Hite Center for Marketing

School of Natural Sciences and Mathematics

The School of Natural Sciences and Mathematics offers both graduate and undergraduate programs in Biology and Molecular Biology, Chemistry and Biochemistry, Geosciences, Mathematical Sciences, and Physics, and a graduate program in Science Education. Undergraduate and post-baccalaureate programs in teacher certification are administratively housed in the School of Natural Sciences and Mathematics but serve other schools as well.

Centers and institutes 
Center for Space Sciences (CSS)
Center for STEM Education and Research

UTeach Dallas

Modeled after UT Austin's teacher preparatory program, UTeach Dallas, in the School of Natural Sciences and Mathematics, addresses the current national deficit of qualified math, science, and computer science teachers, as well as K-12 students' lack of interest in the STEM fields.

Honors
Collegium V is the selective honors and enrichment program of the University of Texas at Dallas. Collegium V offers smaller class sizes and specialized career counseling for students admitted into the program.

Notable alumni 

Aziz Sancar
Naveen Jindal
Gary Farrelly
Christeene Vale
PJ Raval
Gabriel Dawe
Phyllida Barlow
Kelli Connell
Brian Fridge
Stephen Lapthisophon
Dadara

References

External links

Academics
University of Texas at Dallas